Rogneda of Polotsk (962–1002) is the Slavic name for Ragnheiðr, a Princess consort of Rus'. She was the daughter of Ragnvald (Slavic: Rogvolod) who came from Scandinavia and established himself at Polotsk in the mid-10th century.

Life
It has been speculated that Rogneda belonged to the Ynglings royal family of present day Sweden.  According to the Novgorod Fourth Chronicle, in or about 980, Vladimir the Great, on learning that she was betrothed to his half-brother Yaropolk I of Kiev, took Polotsk and forced Rogneda to marry him. Having raped Rogneda in the presence of her parents, he ordered them to be killed, along with two of Rogneda's brothers. <ref>Levin, Eva Sex and Society in the World of the Orthodox Slavs, 900-1700</ref>

Rogneda gave him several children. The four sons were Yaroslav the Wise (though some accounts suggest he may have been the son of Anna Porphyrogenita), Vsevolod, Mstislav of Chernigov, and Izyaslav of Polotsk. She also bore two daughters, one of whom is named by Nestor the Chronicler as Predslava (taken as a concubine of Boleslaus I of Poland, according to Gallus). A later chronicle tells a story, most likely taken from a Norse saga, of Rogneda plotting against Vladimir and asking her elder son, Izyaslav, to kill him. As was the Norse royal custom, she was sent with her elder son to govern the land of her parents, i.e. Polotsk. Izyaslav's line continued to rule Polotsk and the newly found town of Izyaslavl, now called Zaslawye.

After Vladimir converted to Christianity and took Anna Porphyrogeneta as his wife, he had to divorce all his previous wives, including Rogneda. After that, she entered the convent and took the name Anastasia.

Legacy
Around 1825 Kondraty Ryleev wrote a narrative poem entitled Rogneda.  This poem became a literary source for her portrayal in the nationalist Russian opera Rogneda by Alexander Serov, which premiered in 1865.

Issue
By Vladimir the Great:

 Izyaslav of Polotsk (born c. 979, Kiev), Prince of Polotsk (989–1001)
 Yaroslav the Wise (born no earlier than 983), Prince of Rostov (988–1010), Prince of Novgorod (1010–1034), Grand Prince of Kiev (1016–1018, 1019–1054). Possibly he was a son of Anna rather than Rogneda. Another interesting fact that he was younger than Sviatopolk according to the words of Boris in the Tale of Bygone Years'' and not as it was officially known.
 Mstislav of Chernigov (born c. 983), Prince of Tmutarakan (990–1036), Prince of Chernigov (1024–1036), other sources claim him to be son of other mothers (Adela, Malfrida, or some other Bulgarian wife)
 Predslava, concubine of Bolesław I Chrobry according to Gesta principum Polonorum
 Premislava (died 1015), some source state that she was a wife of the Duke Laszlo (Vladislav) "the Bald" of Arpadians
 Mstislava, in 1018 was taken by Bolesław I Chrobry among the other daughters
 Ariogia (?)

Sources

See also
Family life and children of Vladimir I
List of rape victims from history and mythology

962 births
1002 deaths
Kievan Rus' princesses
People from Polotsk
Violence against women in Belarus
Kievan Rus' nuns
10th-century Rus' people
10th-century Rus' women
Belarusian nuns
Wives of Vladimir the Great